Dasydytes is a genus of gastrotrichs belonging to the family Dasydytidae.

The species of this genus are Southern America.

Species:

Dasydytes asymmetricus 
Dasydytes carvalhoae 
Dasydytes elongatus 
Dasydytes goniathrix 
Dasydytes lamellatus 
Dasydytes monile 
Dasydytes nhumirimensis 
Dasydytes ornatus 
Dasydytes papaveroi 
Dasydytes zelinkai

References

Gastrotricha